Beneath the Moors is a fantasy horror novel by English writer Brian Lumley. It was published by Arkham House in 1974 in an edition of 3,842 copies. It was Lumley's second book published by Arkham House. The novel is part of the Cthulhu Mythos.

The short novel incorporates the short story "The Sister City" by Brian Lumley, originally published in 1969.

Plot summary

Professor Ewart Masters convalesces at the home of his nephew, after an automobile accident. There he discovers the existence of an ancient Cimmerian city beneath the Yorkshire moors. He proceeds to have dream adventures in the realms of the Great Old Ones.

Reception
Gahan Wilson praised the novel as "by far the best thing [Lumley]'s done," with "a really dandy climax" and "a highly successful underground horrorland which is solid, consistent, and well designed."

References

Sources

1974 British novels
Cthulhu Mythos novels
Novels by Brian Lumley
Novels set in Yorkshire
Arkham House books